Peter Mingie (22 June 1931 – 24 October 1999) was a Canadian swimmer. He competed in the men's 100 metre backstroke at the 1948 Summer Olympics.

References

External links
 

1931 births
1999 deaths
Olympic swimmers of Canada
Swimmers at the 1948 Summer Olympics
Swimmers from Toronto
Canadian male backstroke swimmers